An infrared spectroscopy correlation table (or table of infrared absorption frequencies) is a list of absorption peaks and frequencies, typically reported in wavenumber, for common types of molecular bonds and functional groups. In physical and analytical chemistry, infrared spectroscopy (IR spectroscopy) is a technique used to identify chemical compounds based on the way infrared radiation is absorbed by the compound.

The absorptions in this range do not apply only to bonds in organic molecules. IR spectroscopy is useful when it comes to analysis of inorganic compounds (such as metal complexes  or fluoromanganates) as well.

Group frequencies
Tables of vibrational transitions of stable and transient molecules are also available.

See also
Applied spectroscopy
Absorption spectroscopy

References

Infrared spectroscopy
Chemistry-related lists